Enar Andrés Bolaños Cascante (born July 18, 1983) is a Costa Rican striker.

Club career
Bolaños played from 1999 to 2009 for Barrio Mexico, before moving abroad to join Salvadoran side Alacranes Del Norte in January 2010. In June 2011 he was snapped up by Orión, but had to leave them a few months later and he later moved to Chirripó, both in the Costa Rican lower divisions.

References

1983 births
Living people
Footballers from San José, Costa Rica
Association football forwards
Costa Rican footballers
Nejapa footballers
Costa Rican expatriate footballers
Expatriate footballers in El Salvador
Costa Rican expatriate sportspeople in El Salvador